The Agfa-Gevaert Tournament was a golf tournament in England from 1963 to 1971. It was played at Stoke Poges Golf Club in Stoke Poges, Buckinghamshire. It was sponsored by Agfa-Gevaert.

Winners

References

Golf tournaments in England
Agfa